The Mustang Boss 302 is a high-performance variant of the Ford Mustang originally produced by Ford in 1969 and 1970, alongside its more powerful sibling the Boss 429 Mustang. Ford revived the name for another two year production run in 2012 and 2013. It was produced for the Trans Am racing series.

First generation (1969–1970)

The Camaro/Mustang rivalry had begun in 1967 with the introduction of the Chevrolet Camaro by General Motors. The Camaro was the largest threat to the lead Ford had in the "pony car" field, a market segment largely created by Ford with the introduction of the Mustang in mid-year 1964. The performance of the Mustang with 289 and 390 engines was not up to the Camaro, with its small block and big block V8. In an effort to improve the Mustang's image, Ford made a 428 Cobra Jet V8, and a Ford Boss 302 engine optional for the 1968 mid-year and 1969 models, respectively.

The 1969–70 Boss 302 (Hi-Po) engine was created in 1968 for the SCCA's 1969 Trans-Am road racing series. Available in the Boss 302 Mustangs of 1969–70, it's a unique Ford small-block engine featuring a thin-wall, high nickel content block casting. It differed substantially from regular 302s, with 4-bolt mains, screw in freeze plugs, and heads using a canted valve design being developed for the planned 351 Cleveland (which debuted the following year). The construction was aided by the two engines sharing a cylinder head bolt pattern, though the Boss 302 heads had to have their coolant passages slightly modified.

This optional engine, and indeed the entire vehicle package, including handling and aerodynamic aids, was made available for the express purpose of meeting the homologation guidelines to compete in the SCCA Trans-Am series, which limited engine displacement to 305 C.I.D. (5.0L) in order to compete. The Boss 429 Mustang was born in a similar way, except with the intent of homologating Ford's new "semi-HEMI" 429 C.I.D. (7.0L) engine (to race in NASCAR, instead of Trans Am). The much larger engine in the Boss 429 reflects the less restrictive engine displacement limits of NASCAR at the time.

The Boss 302 Mustang was styled by Larry Shinoda, a former GM employee. The car featured a reflective "c-stripe".  The fake air scoops in the rear quarter panel fenders of the regular production 1969 Mustangs were eliminated on the Boss 302 models. A black horizontal rear window shade and a blackout hood were both options. It was one of the first production models with a front spoiler and rear deck wing. The name "Boss" came about when Shinoda was asked what project he was working on, he answered "the boss's car" because the project was a secret. Also Shinoda had called it the "Boss" as an homage to the new President of Ford Semon "Bunkie" Knudson who had brought Shinoda over from GM's Chevrolet Division after Knudson had left.

Changes for the 1970 model year included side "hockey stick" stripes which started along the top of the hood, along with the 1970 grille which replaced the four headlights with two vents in the outside position while retaining dual headlights within the grille opening. The dual exhaust system was redesigned, along with the competition suspension and a standard Hurst shifter. The intake valves were slightly smaller, and cast aluminum valve covers replaced the chrome. With a suggested price of $3,720, a total of 7,013 were sold.

In addition to a lower ride height, standard equipment included front disc brakes, larger sway bars, heavier duty spindles, reinforced shock towers, a four speed manual transmission, and the solid-lifter Boss 302 V8 engine, with its free-breathing Cleveland style heads, which had valves larger than most engines more than a third larger in displacement.

Although Ford's Drag Pack option with a special oil cooler was never formally offered on the Boss 302, it was often included with the 4.30:1 rear axle ratio. This coveted option is recognizable when the hood is opened to reveal Ford's vertically mounted oil cooler in front of the radiator. Ford also had an option for Boss 302's and 429's for deluxe interior rather than standard interior

Trans-Am racing

The SCCA Trans-Am series was popular in the late 1960s, especially after the birth of the "pony car". A type of "stock-car" racing usually held on road courses, the series limited maximum engine displacement to 5 liters, or 305 cubic inches. In an effort to be competitive, various Detroit car manufacturers produced some a number of variants of their usual "pony car" lineups in both road and track trim (for homologation purposes), equipped with high-performing variants of their "small" 300-inch class V8 engines in order to make as much power as possible from the limited displacement. The Boss 302 program was part of an effort by the Ford Motor Company to win the coveted SCCA Trans-Am Championship in 1969 and 1970. Penske Camaros had triumphed in 1968 and 1969. Team Penske switched to AMC Javelin the following year so the Boss 302's direct competition in the 1970 series were the AAR Cudas, the Pontiac Firebird, the Team Chaparral Camaros, and the Penske AMC Javelins.

The Ford entry for 1969 and 1970 was the Boss 302 Mustang. In 1969, two factors prevented victory; 1) Tire trouble. 2) Slow pit stops. With Roger Penske (a.k.a. "The organizer") as Chevrolet's racing team manager, the pit stops were magically choreographed and organized to perfection. When pit stop times between Mustangs and Camaros are compared, it turns out Ford lost several races "in the pits". Ford was also using Firestone brand tires, which gave them trouble in 1969. In 1970 they switched to Goodyear. The factory effort was headed up by Bud Moore, who fielded two cars in the 1970 season, and won the championship that year.  The Bud Moore Mustangs edged out Team Penske's Javelins, and lead Penske driver Mark Donohue lost out to Bud Moore driver Parnelli Jones.  Then, in 1971 AMC came out with a redesigned Javelin and returned to the track with ex-Mustang driver, George Follmer and Mark Donohue. With Mark Donohue behind the wheel of the AMC Javelin, the Mustang and the others were defeated in 1971, and again with George Follmer driving the Javelin in 1972.

Australian touring cars

The Boss Mustang platform experienced racing success in Australia, with Canadian-born driver Allan Moffat, driving his Coca-Cola-sponsored Mustang to a recorded 101 wins from 151 starts. Moffat's car was a gift from Ford's American in-house race car fabrication and engineering facility, Kar Kraft, and finished off by Bud Moore Engineering. Moffat raced the Mustang in the Australian Touring Car Championship (ATCC) from 1969 to 1972. Although he failed to place in the top 10 in 1969, he finished 6th in 1970, 2nd in 1971 and 3rd in 1972. As of December 2012, this car has been fully restored to original, and is owned by Queensland based collector David Bowden who regularly shows the car at historic events throughout Australia.

Since its restoration, the only person Bowden has allowed to drive the car (other than his son Dan) is its former owner Allan Moffat. Moffat has said that the car is his favourite car of his 30 years in racing, and that the gift of the car from Ford in 1969 was a pivotal moment in his career.

Collectibility
The Boss 302 is reproduced as a model and toy, with diecast models including Hot Wheels, Matchbox, and Ertl's "American Muscle", and many others. It is recognizable by the "hockey stick" side stripe, rear louvers and chin spoiler (although those features can also signify a Boss 429 Mustang). The 1970 is available, but there are also some 4-headlight 1969 models as well.

Many "Boss clones" (i.e. replicas) have been created, with varying degrees of accuracy, out of regular fastback cars due to the relative rarity and expense of existing examples of the original automobiles, especially race-prepped models.

In 2007, a pair of restored 1969 Boss Mustangs sold for $530,000.

Saleen Parnelli Jones S302 (2007)
In 2007, Saleen and American Racing Legend, Parnelli Jones, created a limited-edition version of the Mustang. Though often called the Saleen/Parnelli Jones S302, it was designed to pay homage to the legendary 1970 Boss 302 that Parnelli Jones had raced in back in the Trans Am series against Javelins, Camaros and Cudas. With only 500 built, all were delivered in the color Grabber Orange. In this homage to the Trans Am race car driven by Parnelli Jones, Steve Saleen modified virtually everything to make it a great looking and great driving car that resembles the championship winning car of 1970. To deliver the Parnelli Jones experience each of the 500 cars were bored and stroked to 302ci to match the Boss 302 motor in the race car. The 302ci Saleen built, 3-valve V8 produces 400 hp and 390 ft-lbs of torque. The high revving engine was blueprinted and balanced, equipped with a Saleen forged steel crankshaft, forged aluminum pistons, Saleen forged connecting rods, Saleen ported aluminum cylinder heads, competition Saleen camshafts and matching valve springs that allow it to rev to its 6,500 rpm all day long if called upon. It's a refreshing change from the "take two blowers and call me in the morning" speed prescription we've all gotten hooked on in the modular engine era. It's also equipped with Saleen under drive pulleys, a billet harmonic balancer and lightweight aluminum flywheel. The rest of the drivetrain includes a rugged Tremec 5-speed transmission with a special close-ratio Saleen shifter and 3.73 rear gears. The exhaust is run through the Saleen 2 1/2" performance stainless system that sounds incredible. The appearance modifications are subtle but make this Mustang stand out. Like the Boss 302 of 1970 modifications include the iconic flat black Shaker hood, rear louvers, special chrome surround of the unique  front and rear fascia, replica mini-lite alloy wheels, replica rear wing, special side skirts, special front spoiler, billet aluminum fuel fill door, hood pins and limited-edition badging. The interior is stunning. It's Black leather with Grabber Orange inserts. Even the dash is autographed by Parnelli Jones and Steve Saleen. Perhaps the best part of this car is the reworked Racecraft suspension that Saleen was so famous for in his race cars, along with the Parnelli inspired Watts link rear suspension components just like the 1970 race car. The car handles like it is on rails, yet is smooth and comfortable. Braking is incredible with special Saleen 4-piston front calipers and vented rotors . This car is a balance of power and handling the "Yin and the Yang" that makes for an unforgettable drive.

Second generation (2012–2013)

Ford revived the Boss 302 nameplate for 2012. The standard 2011 Ford Mustang GT's 5.0-liter Coyote V8 engine is enhanced and was referred to within Ford's development teams as the Road Runner engine. Upgrades include a forged rotating assembly, CNC ported heads, revised camshafts and a high flow "runners in the box" intake taken from the 302R racecar. It produces  at 7400 rpm –  over the standard GT's . A solid rear axle with 3.73:1 differential uses carbon fiber plates in its limited slip differential or an optional Torsen differential. The quad exhaust system made up of two standard Mustang GT outlets and two side pipes that exit on either side of the rear crossover. The side pipes send the exhaust through metal "Attenuation" discs to create an extra growling exhaust sound. The discs are removable and include a spacer plate sized to match aftermarket exhaust dump valves.

The Boss 302 takes the Mustang GT's suspension and adds higher-rate coil springs, stiffer bushings, and a larger diameter rear stabilizer bar. The body is lowered  up front and just  in the rear to give it a more raked stance designed to recall the original. The shock absorbers are adjustable at the shock tower by using a flat head screwdriver. The standard Mustang traction control system and electronic stability control programs have been altered with a new intermediate sport mode designed to allow for more flexibility on the track.

The aero package (i.e. spoilers, splitters, etc.) is almost entirely copied from the Boss 302R race car. The 19-inch black-alloy racing wheels are 9-inches wide up front and 9.5-inches out back and come fitted with 255/40-19 (front) and 285/35-19 (rear) Pirelli P-Zero tires.

Ford produced just over 4000 Boss 302 models in both 2012 and 2013, with just over 750 of those models each year being the Laguna Seca edition.

Boss 302 Laguna Seca edition 

The Boss 302 Laguna Seca edition is a further upgraded version of the Boss 302. Additions include Recaro sport seats, a Torsen limited-slip rear differential (both optional on the standard Boss 302), revised suspension tuning with unique spring and damper rates, and a larger rear stabilizer. The Laguna Seca model loses its rear seats, which are replaced by a cross-car X-brace to increase structural rigidity approximately 10%. It rides on 19x9-inch front (255/40-19) and 19x10 inch rear (285/35-19) light-weight alloy wheels with R-compound ultra high-performance tires. Ford Racing front brake ducts help cool the brakes.

The 2012 Laguna Seca Boss 302 comes in two colors – Black or Ingot Silver – with a red roof and red accents. For 2013, color choices include both School Bus Yellow and Black, both with reflective matte silver stripes. A more aggressive front splitter and a larger rear spoiler increase downforce for high speed track use. Ford produced 750 Laguna Seca versions for 2012 and 2013 years (750 total).

The limited-edition Laguna Seca is designed to maintain street-legality while bridging the gap between the Boss 302 and the track-only Boss 302R and 302S.

References 

Ford Mustang
Muscle cars
Coupés
Cars introduced in 1969
Rear-wheel-drive vehicles